Agnes or Agness may refer to:

People
Agnes (name), the given name, and a list of people named Agnes or Agness
Agnes (surname), list of people with the surname

Places
Agnes, Georgia, United States, a ghost town
Agnes, Missouri, United States, an unincorporated community
Agness, Oregon, United States, an unincorporated community
Agnes Township, Grand Forks County, North Dakota, United States
Agnes, Victoria, Australia, a town

Arts and entertainment

Music
Agnes (band), a Christian rock band
Agnes (album), 2005 album by rock band Agnes
"Agnes" (Donnie Iris song) 1980
"Agnes", a song by Glass Animals for the album How to Be a Human Being
Agnes (singer) a Swedish recording artist

Other arts and entertainment
Agnes (card game), a patience or solitaire card game
Agnes (comic strip), a syndicated comic strip by Tony Cochran
Agnes (film), a 2021 American horror film
Agnes (novel), by Peter Stamm
Agnes, the alias used by the character Agatha Harkness in the miniseries WandaVision
 Agnés Oblige, a main character from the role-playing game Bravely Default

Ships
Agnes (1804), a hired armed lugger of the Royal Navy lost in 1806
Agnes (1849), a wooden brigantine built in 1849 at Point Brenley, Nova Scotia, Canada
Agnes (1853), an Australian merchant ship
Agnes (1875), a wooden carvel schooner built in 1875 at Brisbane Water, New South Wales, Australia
Agnes (1877), a wooden carvel ketch built in 1877 at Williams River, Eagleton, New South Wales, Australia
Agnes (1904), a launch built in 1904 at North Sydney, Australia
Agnes (cutter), a wooden cutter that was wrecked in 1865 in New South Wales, Australia

Other uses
Tropical Storm Agnes, a number of named tropical cyclones
Agnes (gallery), a photography gallery in Birmingham, Alabama (1992–2000)
AGNES (AGglomerative NESting), a variety of the Hierarchical clustering used in data mining and statistics

See also
Agni (disambiguation)
Agnus (disambiguation)